Hrdina jedné noci  is a Czechoslovak comedy film directed by Martin Frič. It was released in 1935.

A German-language version, Held einer Nacht, was filmed at the same time.

Cast
 Vlasta Burian - Florián Svícicka
 Truda Grosslichtová - Elvíra Thompsonová / statistka Hana
 Václav Trégl - Jarda, nezamestnaný
 Jaroslav Marvan - Starosta Zdislavic
 Jarmila Svabíková - Mayor's Wife
 Svetla Svozilová - Paní mistrová
 Eman Fiala - Exekutor
 Helena Monczáková - Exekutorova zena
 Jan Sviták - Filmový rezisér
 Ladislav Hemmer - Freddy, filmový herec
 Marie Ptáková - Hanina matka
 Čeněk Šlégl - Ucitel, clen obecní rady
 Frantisek Cerný - Postmistr, clen obecní rady
 Karel Postranecký - Veritel slecny Elvíry
 Marie Häusslerová - Grandmother
 Václav Piskácek - Town Councillor

References

External links
 

1935 films
1935 comedy films
Czechoslovak black-and-white films
Films directed by Martin Frič
Czechoslovak multilingual films
Czechoslovak comedy films
1935 multilingual films
1930s Czech films